Nita Louise Green (born 23 June 1983) is an Australian politician who was elected as a Senator for Queensland at the 2019 federal election. She is a member of the Australian Labor Party (ALP).

Early life
Green was born in Camperdown, New South Wales. She was raised by a single mother who worked as a nurse. Her mother was born in the United States and arrived in Australia at the age of nine. She holds the degrees of Bachelor of Creative Arts from the University of Wollongong and Juris Doctor from the University of Canberra. While at university she worked in the retail and hospitality sectors.

Career
After being admitted as a solicitor in 2015, Green worked as an employment lawyer for Maurice Blackburn. In 2017, she was the Queensland field director for Australian Marriage Equality during the Australian Marriage Law Postal Survey. She subsequently became an organiser for the Australian Manufacturing Workers' Union, and also worked as a staffer for Senator Murray Watt.

Politics
In August 2018, Green won preselection for Labor's Senate ticket in Queensland, as the representative of the Labor Left faction. She was living on the Gold Coast at the time of her preselection, but later in the year she and her wife relocated to Cairns so that her party would have a senator based in Far North Queensland. She was elected to the Senate at the 2019 federal election in first position on the ALP ticket.

Green is a leader of the LGBTQ group Rainbow Labor. She is an advocate for transgender rights in sport, and has said that women who argue that women's sport should be reserved for cis women are transphobic and that such debates are incredibly hurtful for LGBT youth.

On 1 June 2022, Green was appointed as Special Envoy for the Great Barrier Reef by Prime Minister Anthony Albanese.

References

Australian Labor Party members of the Parliament of Australia
Labor Left politicians
Members of the Australian Senate for Queensland
Living people
Australian women lawyers
Women members of the Australian Senate
Australian people of American descent
LGBT legislators in Australia
21st-century Australian women politicians
21st-century Australian politicians
1983 births
University of Wollongong alumni
University of Canberra alumni
21st-century Australian lawyers